Hesar-e Bala or Hisar Bala or Hesar Bala may refer to:

Hesar-e Bala, Damavand, Tehran Province
Hesar-e Bala, Varamin, Tehran Province
Hesar-e Bala, Zanjan

See also
Hesar-e Olya (disambiguation)